Draconarius is a genus of Asian funnel weavers first described by S. V. Ovtchinnikov in 1999.

Species
 it contains 259 species:

D. abbreviatus Dankittipakul & Wang, 2003 — Thailand
D. absentis Wang, 2003 — China
D. acidentatus (Peng & Yin, 1998) — China
D. acroprocessus Zhang, Zhu & Wang, 2017 — China
D. acutus Xu & Li, 2008 — China
D. adligansus (Peng & Yin, 1998) — China
D. adnatus Wang, Griswold & Miller, 2010 — China
D. agrestis Wang, 2003 — China
D. altissimus (Hu, 2001) — China
D. anceps Wang, Griswold & Miller, 2010 — China
D. anthonyi Dankittipakul & Wang, 2003 — Thailand
D. arcuatus (Chen, 1984) — China
D. argenteus (Wang, Yin, Peng & Xie, 1990) — China
D. aspinatus (Wang, Yin, Peng & Xie, 1990) — China
D. auriculatus Xu & Li, 2006 — China
D. auriformis Xu & Li, 2007 — China
D. australis Dankittipakul, Sonthichai & Wang, 2006 — Thailand
D. bannaensis Liu & Li, 2010 — China
D. baronii (Brignoli, 1978) — Bhutan
D. baxiantaiensis Wang, 2003 — China
D. beloniforis Wang & Martens, 2009 — Nepal
D. bifarius Wang & Martens, 2009 — Nepal
D. bituberculatus (Wang, Yin, Peng & Xie, 1990) — China
D. bounnami Wang & Jäger, 2008 — Laos
D. brachialis Xu & Li, 2007 — China
D. brevikarenos Wang & Martens, 2009 — Nepal
D. brunneus (Hu & Li, 1987) — China
D. calcariformis (Wang, 1994) — China
D. cangshanensis Zhang, Zhu & Wang, 2017 — China
D. capitellus Wang & Martens, 2009 — Nepal
D. carinatus (Wang, Yin, Peng & Xie, 1990) — China
D. catillus Wang, Griswold & Miller, 2010 — China
D. cavernalis (Huang, Peng & Li, 2002) — China
D. cavus Zhang, Zhu & Wang, 2017 — China
D. chaiqiaoensis (Zhang, Peng & Kim, 1997) — China
D. cheni (Platnick, 1989) — China
D. chuandian Zhang, Zhu & Wang, 2017 — China
D. clavellatus Liu, Li & Pham, 2010 — Vietnam
D. cochleariformis Liu & Li, 2009 — China
D. colubrinus Zhang, Zhu & Song, 2002 — China
D. communis Wang & Martens, 2009 — Nepal
D. complanatus Xu & Li, 2008 — China
D. condocephalus Wang & Martens, 2009 — Nepal
D. confusus Wang & Martens, 2009 — Nepal
D. contiguus Wang & Martens, 2009 — Nepal
D. coreanus (Paik & Yaginuma, 1969) — Korea, Japan
D. cucphuongensis Liu, Li & Pham, 2010 — Vietnam
D. cucullatus Zhang, Zhu & Wang, 2017 — China
D. curiosus Wang, 2003 — China
D. curvabilis Wang & Jäger, 2007 — China
D. curvus Wang, Griswold & Miller, 2010 — China
D. cylindratus Wang & Martens, 2009 — Nepal
D. dapaensis Wang & Martens, 2009 — Nepal
D. davidi (Schenkel, 1963) — China
D. denisi (Schenkel, 1963) — China
D. dialeptus Okumura, 2013 — Japan
D. digituliscaput Chen, Zhu & Kim, 2008 — China
D. digitusiformis (Wang, Yin, Peng & Xie, 1990) — China
D. disgregus Wang, 2003 — China
D. dissitus Wang, 2003 — China
D. distinctus Wang & Martens, 2009 — Nepal
D. dorsicephalus Wang & Martens, 2009 — Nepal
D. dorsiprocessus Zhang, Zhu & Wang, 2017 — China
D. drepanoides Jiang & Chen, 2015 — China
D. dubius Wang, 2003 — China
D. duplus Wang, Griswold & Miller, 2010 — China
D. elatus Dankittipakul & Wang, 2004 — Thailand
D. ellipticus Liu, Li & Pham, 2010 — Vietnam
D. episomos Wang, 2003 — China
D. euryembolus Wang, Griswold & Miller, 2010 — China
D. exiguus Liu & Li, 2010 — China
D. expansus Xu & Li, 2008 — China
D. flos Wang & Jäger, 2007 — China
D. gigas Wang, Griswold & Miller, 2010 — China
D. globulatus Chami-Kranon, Sonthichai & Wang, 2006 — Thailand
D. gorkhaensis Wang & Martens, 2009 — Nepal
D. griswoldi Wang, 2003 — China
D. guizhouensis (Peng, Li & Huang, 2002) — China
D. guoi Wang, Griswold & Miller, 2010 — China
D. gurkha (Brignoli, 1976) — Nepal
D. gyriniformis (Wang & Zhu, 1991) — China
D. hallaensis Kim & Lee, 2007 — Korea
D. hangzhouensis (Chen, 1984) — China
D. hanoiensis Wang & Jäger, 2008 — Vietnam
D. haopingensis Wang, 2003 — China
D. harduarae (Biswas & Roy, 2008) — India
D. hengshanensis (Tang & Yin, 2003) — China
D. himalayaensis (Hu, 2001) — China
D. hui (Dankittipakul & Wang, 2003) — China
D. huizhunesis (Wang & Xu, 1988) — China
D. huongsonensis Wang & Jäger, 2008 — Vietnam
D. immensus Xu & Li, 2006 — China
D. indistinctus (Xu & Li, 2006) — China
D. infulatus (Wang, Yin, Peng & Xie, 1990) — China
D. inthanonensis Dankittipakul & Wang, 2003 — Thailand
D. jiafu Zhang, Zhu & Wang, 2017 — China
D. jiangyongensis (Peng, Gong & Kim, 1996) — China
D. joshimath Quasin, Siliwal & Uniyal, 2017 — India
D. kavanaughi Wang, Griswold & Miller, 2010 — China
D. kayasanensis (Paik, 1972) — Korea
D. labiatus (Wang & Ono, 1998) — Taiwan
D. latellai Marusik & Ballarin, 2011 — Pakistan
D. lateralis Dankittipakul & Wang, 2004 — Thailand
D. laticavus Wang, Griswold & Miller, 2010 — China
D. latidens Wang & Jäger, 2008 — Laos
D. latiforus Wang & Martens, 2009 — Nepal
D. latisectus Zhang, Zhu & Wang, 2017 — China
D. levyi Wang, Griswold & Miller, 2010 — China
D. lhasa Zhang, Zhu & Wang, 2017 — China
D. lini Liu & Li, 2009 — China
D. linxiaensis Wang, 2003 — China
D. linzhiensis (Hu, 2001) — China
D. longissimus Liu, Li & Pham, 2010 — Vietnam
D. longlingensis Wang, Griswold & Miller, 2010 — China
D. lunularis Zhang, Zhu & Wang, 2017 — China
D. lutulentus (Wang, Yin, Peng & Xie, 1990) — China
D. magicus Liu, Li & Pham, 2010 — Vietnam
D. magnarcuatus Xu & Li, 2008 — China
D. magniceps (Schenkel, 1936) — China
D. manus Wang & Zhang, 2018 — China
D. medogensis Zhang, Zhu & Wang, 2017 — China
D. meganiger Wang & Martens, 2009 — Nepal
D. microcoelotes Wang & Martens, 2009 — Nepal
D. mikrommatos Wang, Griswold & Miller, 2010 — China
D. molluscus (Wang, Yin, Peng & Xie, 1990) — China
D. monticola Dankittipakul, Sonthichai & Wang, 2006 — Thailand
D. montis Dankittipakul, Sonthichai & Wang, 2006 — Thailand
D. multidentatus Zhang, Zhu & Wang, 2017 — China
D. mupingensis Xu & Li, 2006 — China
D. nanyuensis (Peng & Yin, 1998) — China
D. naranensis Ovtchinnikov, 2005 — Pakistan
D. neixiangensis (Hu, Wang & Wang, 1991) — China
D. nudulus Wang, 2003 — China
D. olorinus Wang, Griswold & Miller, 2010 — China
D. orbiculatus Zhu, Wang & Zhang, 2017 — China
D. ornatus (Wang, Yin, Peng & Xie, 1990) — China
D. ovillus Xu & Li, 2007 — China
D. pakistanicus Ovtchinnikov, 2005 — Pakistan
D. panchtharensis Wang & Martens, 2009 — Nepal
D. papai Chami-Kranon, Sonthichai & Wang, 2006 — Thailand
D. papillatus Xu & Li, 2006 — China
D. paracidentatus Zhang, Zhu & Wang, 2017 — China
D. paraepisomos Wang & Martens, 2009 — Nepal
D. paralateralis Dankittipakul & Wang, 2004 — Thailand
D. paralleloides Jiang, Chen & Zhang, 2018 — China
D. parallelus Liu & Li, 2009 — China
D. paralutulentus Zhang, Zhu & Wang, 2017 — China
D. paraspiralis Wang, Griswold & Miller, 2010 — China
D. paraterebratus Wang, 2003 — China
D. paratrifasciatus Wang & Jäger, 2007 — China
D. penicillatus (Wang, Yin, Peng & Xie, 1990) — China
D. peregrinus Xie & Chen, 2011 — China
D. phuhin Dankittipakul, Sonthichai & Wang, 2006 — Thailand
D. phulchokiensis Wang & Martens, 2009 — Nepal
D. pictus (Hu, 2001) — China
D. pinguis Jiang, Chen & Zhang, 2018 — China
D. pollex Zhang, Zhu & Wang, 2017 — China
D. postremus Wang & Jäger, 2008 — Laos
D. potanini (Schenkel, 1963) — China
D. prolixus (Wang, Yin, Peng & Xie, 1990) — China
D. promontorioides Dankittipakul & Wang, 2008 — Thailand
D. promontorius Dankittipakul, Sonthichai & Wang, 2006 — Thailand
D. pseudoagrestis Wang, Griswold & Miller, 2010 — China
D. pseudoclavellatus Liu, Li & Pham, 2010 — Vietnam
D. pseudocoreanus Xu & Li, 2008 — China
D. pseudodissitus Zhang, Zhu & Wang, 2017 — China
D. pseudogurkha Wang & Martens, 2009 — Nepal
D. pseudolateralis Dankittipakul & Wang, 2004 — Thailand
D. pseudomeganiger Wang & Martens, 2009 — Nepal
D. pseudopumilus Liu, Li & Pham, 2010 — Vietnam
D. pseudospiralis Wang, Griswold & Miller, 2010 — China
D. pseudowuermlii Wang, 2003 — China
D. pumilus Liu, Li & Pham, 2010 — Vietnam
D. qingzangensis (Hu, 2001) — China
D. quattour Wang, Griswold & Miller, 2010 — China
D. renalis Wang, Griswold & Miller, 2010 — China
D. retrotubularis Zhang, Zhu & Wang, 2017 — China
D. rimatus Liu, Li & Pham, 2010 — Vietnam
D. rotulus Liu, Li & Pham, 2010 — Vietnam
D. rotundus Wang, 2003 — China
D. rufulus (Wang, Yin, Peng & Xie, 1990) — China
D. sacculus Wang & Martens, 2009 — Nepal
D. schawalleri Wang & Martens, 2009 — Nepal
D. schenkeli (Brignoli, 1978) — Bhutan
D. schwendingeri Dankittipakul, Sonthichai & Wang, 2006 — Thailand
D. semicircularis Liu & Li, 2009 — China
D. semicirculus Wang & Martens, 2009 — Nepal
D. seorsus Wang & Martens, 2009 — Nepal
D. siamensis Dankittipakul & Wang, 2003 — Thailand
D. sichuanensis Wang & Jäger, 2007 — China
D. silva Dankittipakul, Sonthichai & Wang, 2006 — Thailand
D. silvicola Dankittipakul, Sonthichai & Wang, 2006 — Thailand
D. simplicidens Wang, 2003 — China
D. simplicifolis Wang & Martens, 2009 — Nepal
D. singulatus (Wang, Yin, Peng & Xie, 1990) — China
D. songi Wang & Jäger, 2008 — Laos
D. specialis Xu & Li, 2007 — China
D. spinosus Wang & Martens, 2009 — Nepal
D. spiralis Wang, Griswold & Miller, 2010 — China
D. spirallus Xu & Li, 2007 — China
D. stemmleri (Brignoli, 1978) — Bhutan
D. streptus (Zhu & Wang, 1994) — China
D. striolatus (Wang, Yin, Peng & Xie, 1990) — China
D. strophadatus (Zhu & Wang, 1991) — China
D. subabsentis Xu & Li, 2008 — China
D. subaspinatus Zhang, Zhu & Wang, 2017 — China
D. subconfusus Wang & Martens, 2009 — Nepal
D. subdissitus Zhang, Zhu & Wang, 2017 — China
D. subepisomos Wang & Martens, 2009 — Nepal
D. sublutulentus Xu & Li, 2008 — China
D. subrotundus Wang & Martens, 2009 — Nepal
D. subterebratus Zhang, Zhu & Wang, 2017 — China
D. subtitanus (Hu, 1992) — China
D. subulatus Dankittipakul & Wang, 2003 — Thailand
D. suttisani Dankittipakul & Wang, 2008 — Thailand
D. syzygiatus (Zhu & Wang, 1994) — China
D. tabularis Wang & Jäger, 2008 — Laos
D. tabulatus Zhang, Zhu & Wang, 2017 — China
D. taihangensis Zhang, Zhu & Wang, 2017 — China
D. tamdaoensis Liu, Li & Pham, 2010 — Vietnam
D. tangi Wang, Griswold & Miller, 2010 — China
D. taplejungensis Wang & Martens, 2009 — Nepal
D. tensus Xu & Li, 2008 — China
D. tentus Dankittipakul, Sonthichai & Wang, 2006 — Thailand
D. terebratus (Peng & Wang, 1997) — China
D. testudinatus Wang & Martens, 2009 — Nepal
D. tianlin Zhang, Zhu & Wang, 2017 — China
D. tiantangensis Xie & Chen, 2011 — China
D. tibetensis Wang, 2003 — China
D. tinjuraensis Wang & Martens, 2009 — Nepal
D. tongi Xu & Li, 2007 — China
D. transparens Liu, Li & Pham, 2010 — Vietnam
D. transversus Liu, Li & Pham, 2010 — Vietnam
D. triatus (Zhu & Wang, 1994) — China
D. tridens Wang, Griswold & Miller, 2010 — China
D. trifasciatus (Wang & Zhu, 1991) — China
D. trinus Wang & Jäger, 2007 — China
D. tritos Wang & Martens, 2009 — Nepal
D. tryblionatus (Wang & Zhu, 1991) — China
D. tubercularis Xu & Li, 2007 — China
D. turriformis Liu & Li, 2010 — China
D. uncinatus (Wang, Yin, Peng & Xie, 1990) — China
D. ventrifurcatus Xu & Li, 2008 — China
D. venustus Ovtchinnikov, 1999 — Tajikistan
D. verrucifer Okumura, 2013 — Japan
D. volubilis Liu, Li & Pham, 2010 — Vietnam
D. volutobursarius Wang & Martens, 2009 — Nepal
D. wenzhouensis (Chen, 1984) — China
D. wolongensis Zhang, Zhu & Wang, 2017 — China
D. wrasei Wang & Jäger, 2010 — China
D. wudangensis (Chen & Zhao, 1997) — China
D. wuermlii (Brignoli, 1978) — Bhutan, Nepal
D. wugeshanensis (Zhang, Yin & Kim, 2000) — China
D. xishuiensis Zhang, Zhu & Wang, 2017 — China
D. xuae Wang, Griswold & Miller, 2010 — China
D. yadongensis (Hu & Li, 1987) — China, Nepal
D. yani Wang, Griswold & Miller, 2010 — China
D. yichengensis Wang, 2003 — China
D. zonalis Xu & Li, 2008 — China

References

External links 

Agelenidae
Araneomorphae genera